The Pontypridd Deanery is a Roman Catholic deanery in the Archdiocese of Cardiff which covers several churches and the university chaplaincy in Pontypridd and the surrounding area of Rhondda, the southernmost part of the Cynon Valley, and Caerphilly. In the early 2000s, the Head of the Valleys deanery was split. The churches in its western part, in the county boroughs of Merthyr Tydfil and Rhondda Cynon Taf, became part of the Pontypridd deanery and the churches in its eastern part, in the county borough of Blaenau Gwent, became part of the North Gwent Deanery.

Churches 

 St Thomas, Abercynon
 St Peter, Bargoed – served from Abercynon
 St Helen, Caerphilly
 Our Lady of Lourdes, Mountain Ash
 St Joseph, Aberdare – served from Mountain Ash
 St Therese of Lisieux, Hirwaun – served from Mountain Ash
 St Mary, Merthyr Tydfil
 St Aloysius, Gurnos – served from Merthyr Tydfil
 St Illtyd, Dowlais – served from Merthyr Tydfil
 St Benedict, Merthyr Vale – served from Merthyr Tydfil
 Ss Gabriel and Raphael, Tonypandy
 St Dyfrig, Treforest
 Glamorgan University Chaplaincy – served from Treforest
 All Hallows, Llantrisant- served from Treforest
 St Mary Magdalene, Ynyshir

Gallery

References

External links
 Pontypridd Deanery Website
 St Thomas Parish site
 Merthyr Tydfil Parish site
 St Helen's Catholic Church, Caerphilly Website
 St Dyfrig Parish site
 Ss Gabriel and Raphael Parish site
 St Mary Magdalene Parish site
 Mountain Ash Parish site

Roman Catholic Deaneries in the Archdiocese of Cardiff